Dictionary order may refer to:
Alphabetical order § Treatment of multiword strings
Other collation systems used to order words in dictionaries
Lexicographic order in mathematics